This article contains the monthly cumulative number of deaths from the pandemic of coronavirus disease 2019 (COVID-19) reported by each country, territory, and subnational area to the World Health Organization (WHO) and published in WHO reports, tables, and spreadsheets. There are also maps and timeline graphs of daily and weekly deaths worldwide. 

 confirmed COVID-induced deaths have been reported worldwide. As of January 2023, taking into account likely COVID induced deaths via excess deaths, the 95% confidence interval suggests the pandemic to have caused between 16 and 28.2 million deaths. For the latest daily updates of cases, deaths, and death rates see COVID-19 pandemic death rates by country. For even more international statistics in table, graph, and map form see COVID-19 pandemic by country and territory.

Timelines of daily deaths worldwide

Data for the graphs is from the COVID-19 Data Repository by the Center for Systems Science and Engineering (CSSE) at Johns Hopkins University. Rolling 7-day average.

Timeline of weekly deaths worldwide

Data for the graph is from the COVID-19 Data Repository by the Center for Systems Science and Engineering (CSSE) at Johns Hopkins University.

Maps of deaths by country 
Data is from the COVID-19 Data Repository by the Center for Systems Science and Engineering (CSSE) at Johns Hopkins University.

Scientific analysis

A December 2022 WHO study comprehensively estimated excess deaths from the pandemic during 2020 and 2021, concluding ~14.8 million excess early deaths occurred, reaffirming their prior calculations from May as well as updating them, addressing criticisms. These numbers do not include measures like years of potential life lost, far exceeding the 5.42 million officially reported deaths for that timeframe, may make the pandemic 2021's leading cause of death, and are similar to the ~18 million estimated by another study (see below).

In October 2020, a group of scientists, including those from the Imperial College COVID-19 Response Team, published an analysis of the all-cause mortality effect of the first wave of the COVID-19 pandemic for 21 industrialised countries – including its timing, demographics and excess deaths per capita – and assessed determinants for substantial variations in death rates such as the countries' pandemic preparedness and management.

An analysis published in The Lancet in March 2022 by Wang et al. suggests up to 18 million lives may have been lost to the pandemic. Such deaths also include, for example, deaths due to healthcare capacity constraints and priorities, as well as reluctance to seek care (to avoid possible infection). Further research may help distinguish the proportions directly caused by COVID-19 from those caused by indirect consequences of the pandemic.

Cumulative monthly death totals by country

2020

2021. 1st half

2021. 2nd half

2022

See also 

List of epidemics
List of deaths due to COVID-19 – notable individual deaths
COVID-19 vaccine 
Deployment of COVID-19 vaccines

Notes

References

External links 

 COVID-19 Risk Factors

 
Timelines of the COVID-19 pandemic